Shehrnaz is a Pakistani television drama serial, aired on Urdu 1 from 12 November 2016 to 22 March 2017. It starred Ayeza Khan, Alyy Khan, Imran Ashraf and Farhan Ahmed Malhi. It is produced by Ayeza Khan's husband Danish Taimoor. It's makeup and stylish is done by Qurat-ul-Ain (Aini) and styled by Anila Murtaza. Amina Yasmeen and Sana Abbas are wardrobes of Ayeza while Maaz jee is the wardrobe of Alyy.

Plot
The story revolves around a beautiful girl Shehrnaaz. She lives with her father who is a poor tailor in Karachi's poor area. Despite of their poverty, her father has made sure that his daughter goes to a top university. 
Shehrnaaz knows her is beautiful and stands out amongst her peers. She wants to be a top class actress. 
Unfortunately, her background is a big hurdle in pursuing her career. Eventually she succeeds in her dream. But she has to pay a huge cost in achieving this success....

Cast 
 Ayeza Khan as Shehrnaz
 Imran Ashraf as Nofil
 Alyy Khan as KK
 Farhan Ahmed Malhi as Sherry
Ghana Ali as Sarah
Komal Iqbal as Hina
Sajid Hassan as Naseeb Gul (Guest appearance)
Mehmood Akhtar as Sherry's uncle
 Nida Mumtaz as Sherry's aunt
 Humaira Bano as Sherry's mother	
 Anam Tanveer
 Sonia Rao
 Rameez Siddiqui
 Maria Baloch
 Faisal H. Naqvi

See also 
 2016 in Pakistani television

References

External links 
 
 , by Urdu 1

Pakistani drama television series
Pakistani film series
2016 Pakistani television series debuts
2017 Pakistani television series endings
Urdu-language television shows
Urdu 1
Urdu 1 original programming